The Inagh River is a river of County Clare, western Ireland. It takes in the Dealagh River and flows into Liscannor Bay at Lahinch after flowing through Lahinch Golf Course. The ruins of Dough Castle lie on its banks on the golf course, as once also did O'Brien's Castle, and it is crossed by a bridge of the same name.

References

Rivers of County Clare